José Antonio Figueroa Freyre (June 13, 1914 – April 13, 2004), nicknamed "Tito", was a Puerto Rican professional pitcher in the Negro leagues.

A native of Mayagüez, Puerto Rico, Figueroa was the brother of fellow Negro leaguer Tite Figueroa. He was a member of the Puerto Rico national baseball team and won the gold medal in javelin at the 1935 and 1938 Central American and Caribbean Games. Figueroa played for the New York Cubans in 1940. He died in 2004 at age 89.

References

External links
 and Seamheads

1914 births
2004 deaths
New York Cubans players
People from Mayagüez, Puerto Rico
Central American and Caribbean Games gold medalists for Puerto Rico
Baseball pitchers
Puerto Rican baseball players
Puerto Rican male javelin throwers
Central American and Caribbean Games medalists in athletics